Marston Moor railway station served the village of Long Marston, North Yorkshire, England from 1848 to 1967 on the Harrogate line.

History 
The station opened as Marston on 30 October 1848 by the East and West Yorkshire Junction Railway. The station was situated west of the level crossing on Marston Lane. It bears the name of the Battle of Marston Moor in 1644. On the Ordnance Survey map of 1850, the station was called 'Marston and Monkston Station', although Monkston was never a part of the official name and the local village was known as Monkton, not Monkston. The station had 'Moor' added to its name on 1 October 1896. Goods facilities were located on both sides and were entered from the west. Behind the south platform was a siding that served a loading dock and a coal depot. North of the running line a short siding backed the York-bound platform with another being a short distance to the west and a long head shunt. In 1913, the goods handled at the station were hay, clover, coal and livestock. The station was not closed during the First World War. Passengers had little opportunity to enjoy DMUs when they were introduced in August 1958, closing a month later to passengers on 15 September 1958. The station closed to goods traffic on 3 May 1965 and parcel services ceased in 1967.

References

External links 

Disused railway stations in North Yorkshire
Former North Eastern Railway (UK) stations
Railway stations in Great Britain opened in 1848
Railway stations in Great Britain closed in 1958
1848 establishments in England
1967 disestablishments in England